Ballyhanedin is a townland in the civil parish of Banagher in County Londonderry, Northern Ireland. It is located a 3km from the village of Feeny, and is situated within Causeway Coast and Glens district. 

It lies on the A6 Belfast to Derry road. Although it is only a townland, Ballyhanedin has a boundary sign which shows where it begins.

History
The townland was settled in the seventeenth century by the Worshipful Company of Fishmongers of the City of London. A report in the Company's archives reports a deputation which surveyed its Estates in 1820: 

The Court of the Fishmongers' Company decided to build two new Presbyterian Church meeting houses in the Classical Greek style, with dressings  of Dungiven sandstone. The Court voted £2,200 for the building at Banagher, which was constructed over three years and opened in 1834. 

An Ordnance Survey memoir of Banagher from the 1830s, says that the new meeting house was: 

Griffith's valuation of Ireland, completed in 1864, shows some thirty tenements in Ballyhanedin, including one occupied by the Reverend Robert Rogers. The other surnames of those then occupying property in the township were Allen, Brazil, Christie, Cole, Connor, Dogherty, Duddy, Evans, Hewston, Lyons, McClusky, McKeever, McLenihan, McLoughlin, Monteith, Mulfawl, Nutt, Rosborough (eight tenements), Sherrard, Simpson, Walker and Williams.

Present day
Much of the townland is rural. Photographs of this area some miles out of Feeny are online at geograph.org.uk and include a windswept hill to the north of the junction of Ballyhanedin Road and Glenshane Road. Some of the fields have substantial drum-shaped stone gateposts, which are common in Northern Ireland.

As part of the Munreery Climbing Lane road scheme, completed in 2005 to improve the A6 Glenshane Road west of Dungiven, the former 'Bennett junction' at the Ballyhanedin crossroads, which dated from the 1960s, was replaced by a 'ghost island' layout.

Notes

Townlands of County Londonderry
Causeway Coast and Glens district